The 2nd European Athletics U23 Championships were held in Gothenburg, Sweden, at Ullevi from 29 July to 1 August 1999.

Complete results and medal winners were published.

Results

Men

Women

Medal table

Participation
According to an unofficial count, 726 athletes from 42 countries participated in the event.

 (2)
 (2)
 (4)
 (18)
 (10)
 (7)
 (4)
 (8)
 (28)
 (4)
 (3)
 (32)
 (67)
 (1)
 (73)
 (1)
 (64)
 (20)
 (27)
 (3)
 (11)
 (2)
 (31)
 (7)
 (9)
 (1)
 (1)
 (2)
 (13)
 (9)
 (41)
 (15)
 (23)
 (32)
 (10)
 (11)
 (61)
 (28)
 (7)
 (5)
 (17)
 (12)

References

 Results
 Full results 

 
European Athletics U23 Championships
European Athletics U23 Championships
Athletics
International athletics competitions hosted by Sweden
European Athletics U23 Championships
European Athletics U23 Championships
1990s in Gothenburg